Leo Burke is a wrestler.

Leo Burke may also refer to:

 Leo Burke (baseball) (born 1934), retired American utility player in Major League Baseball
 Leo Burke (footballer) (1891–1957), Australian rules footballer